Alipurduar subdivision is an administrative division of the Alipurduar district in the Indian state of West Bengal.

Geography

Subdivisions
Alipurduar district is divided into the following administrative subdivisions:

Administrative units
Alipurduar subdivision has 8 police stations, 6 community development blocks, 6 panchayat samitis, 66 gram panchayats, 338 mouzas, 337 inhabited villages, 1 municipality and 20 census towns. The municipality is: Alipurduar. The census towns are: Sisha Jumrha, Uttar Madarihat, Jaigaon, Mechiabasti, Uttar Satali, Uttar Latabari, Jagijhora Barabak, Jateswar, Parangarpar, Falakata, Paschim Jitpur, Chechakhata, Alipurduar Railway Junction, Bholar Dabri, Birpara, Samuktola, Sobhaganj, Laskarpara, Dakshin Rampur and Uttar Kamakhyaguri. The subdivision has its headquarters at Alipurduar.

Police stations
Police stations in the Alipurduar subdivision have the following features and jurisdiction:

Gram panchayats
The subdivision contains 66 gram panchayats under 6 community development blocks:

 Madarihat Birpara block consists of ten gram panchayats, viz. Bandapani, Hantapara, Madarihat, Totopara Ballalguri, Birpara–I, Khayarbari, Rangalibajna, Birpara–II, Lankapara and Shishujhumra.

 Alipurduar I block consists of 11 gram panchayats, viz. Banchukamari, Parorpar, Shalkumar–I, Vivekananda–I, Chakowakheti, Patlakhawa, Shalkumar–II, Vivekananda–II, Mathura, Purba Kanthalbari and Tapsikhata.

 Alipurduar II block consists of 11 gram panchayats, viz. Chaporer Par–I, Mahakalguri, Samuktala, Turturi, Chaparerpar–II, Majherdabri, Tatpara–I, Bhatibari, Kohinoor, Parokata and Tatpara–II.

 Falakata block consists of 12 gram panchayats, viz. Dalgaon, Dhanirampur–II, Guabarnagar, Mairadanga, Deogaon, Falakata–I, Jateswar–I, Parangerpar, Dhanirampur–I, Falakata–II, Jateswar–II and Shalkumar. 

 Kalchini block consists of 11 gram panchayats, viz. Jaigaon–I, Jaigaon–II, Dalshing Para, Malangi, Satali, Mendabari, Latabari, Chuapara, Kalchini, Garopara and Rajabhatkawa.

 Kumargram block consists of 11 gram panchayats, viz. Chengamari, Khoardanga–I, Newland Kumargram Sankos, Turturikhanda, Kamakhyaguri–I, Khoardanga–II, Valka Barabisa–I, Kamakhyaguri–II, Kumargram, Raidak, Valka Barabisa–II.

Blocks
Community development blocks in the Alipurduar subdivision are:

Education
Given in the table below (data in numbers) is a comprehensive picture of the education scenario in Alipurduar subdivision/ Alipurduar district, with data for the year 2013-14.

Educational institutions
The following institutions are located in the Alipuduar subdivision:
Alipurduar University was established in 2018 at Alipurduar.
Alipurduar College was established in 1957. Affiliated with the University of North Bengal, it offers courses in arts, science and commerce.
Alipurduar Mahila Mahavidyalaya was established in 2007. Affiliated with the University of North Bengal, it offers courses in arts.
Vivekanada College was established at Alipurduar in 1985. Affiliated with the University of North Bengal, it offers courses in arts and science.
Lilabati Mahavidyalaya was established at Jateswar in 2013. Affiliated with the University of North Bengal, it offers courses in arts.
Falakata College was established at Falakata in 1981. Affiliated with the University of North Bengal, it offers courses in arts.
Saheed Kshudiram College was established at Kamakhyaguri in 1996. Affiliated with the University of North Bengal, it offers courses in arts and science.
Nani Bhattacharya Smarak Mahavidyalaya was established in 2000 at Mangalbari, PO Jaigaon. Affiliated with the University of North Bengal, it offers courses in arts.
Pijushkanti Mukherjee Mahavidyalaya was established at Sonapur in 2015. Affiliated with the University of North Bengal, it offers courses in arts.
Birpara College was established at Birpara in 1986. Affiliated with the University of North Bengal, it offers courses in arts and commerce.
Samuktala Sidhu Kanhu College was established at Samuktala in 2010.  Affiliated with the University of North Bengal, it offers courses in arts.

Healthcare
The table below (all data in numbers) presents an overview of the medical facilities available and patients treated in the hospitals, health centres and sub-centres in 2014 in Alipurduar subdivision/ district, with data for the year 2012-13.: 

.* Excluding nursing homes.

Medical facilities
Medical facilities in the Alipurduar subdivision are as follows:

Hospitals: (Name, location, beds) 
Alipurduar Subdivisional Hospital, Alipurduar M, 250 beds
Alipurduar Jail Hospital, Alipurduar, 9 beds
Alipurduar Railway Hospital, Alipurduar, 111 beds
Birpara State General Hospital, Birpara, 100 beds
Rajabhatkhawa Railway Hospital, Rajabhatkhawa, Kalchini CD block, 2 beds

Rural Hospitals: (Name, CD block, location, beds) 
Falakata Rural Hospital, Falakata CD block, Falakata, 30 beds
Kamakhyaguri Rural Hospital, Kumargram CD block, Kamakhyaguri, 30 beds
Madarihat Rural Hospital, Madarihat-Birpara CD block, Madarihat, 30 beds
Uttarlatabari Rural Hospital, Kalchini CD block, Kalchini, 30 beds
Pachkalguri Rural Hospital, Alipurduar I CD block, Pachkalguri, 30 beds
Jasodanga Rural Hospital, Alipurduar II CD block, Jashodanga, 30 beds
Bhatibari Rural Hospital, Alipurduar II CD block, Bhatibari, 20 beds

Primary Health Centres : (CD block-wise)(CD block, PHC location, beds)
Kumargram CD block: Kumargram (6), Barabisa (PO Kumargram) (6).
Falakata CD block: Chhoto Salkumar (4), Jateswar (6).
Madarihat CD block: Madhyarangali Bazar (PO Gopal Bagan) (10), Sishujhuara (PO Sishubarihat) (6), Totopara (10).
Kalchini CD block: Satali (PO Satali Mondalpur) (4), Jaigaon (?)
Alipurduar I CD block: Munshipara (PO Salkumarhat) (4), Silbarihat (10).
Alipurduar II CD block: Samuktala (10), Turturi (4).

References

Subdivisions of West Bengal
Subdivisions in Alipurduar district
Alipurduar district